The AN/TPS-44 is a transportable 2-dimensional air search radar produced in the United States originally by Cardion Electronics.

Description 

The AN/TPS-44 is a ground-based, non-fixed (i.e.: transportable) search radar. 

The main components of the system are a shelter (where the crew operates it) and the foldable antenna. These components are the two loads into which the system can be broken down, and packed into two M35 trucks for road transport, or airlifted via helicopter or cargo plane.

Operational history 

The AN/TPS-44 completed development in the early 1960s and entered US Air Force service in the late 1960s during the Vietnam War. It is still in service with the United States and other countries, including Argentina.

Users 

  - Argentine Army - In the early 1980s six sets were purchased, one was lost in the Falklands War.

Specifications
 Weight (including shelter): 
 Frequency range: 1.25 to 1.35 GHz (L-Band)
 Pulse repetition frequency: 267 to 800 Hz
 Pulse width: 1.4 to 4.2 microseconds
 Peak power: 1.0 MW
 Average power: 1.12 KW
 Beam width (horizontal): 1.1 degrees
 Beam width (vertical): 3.8 degrees
 Antenna rotation rate: 0 to 15 rpm
 Maximum display range: 
 Antenna characteristics:

See also 

 AN/TPS-43 radar
 List of military electronics of the United States

Footnotes

References

Notes

Sources
 radartutorial.eu - Register of historical and current radar sets – AN/TPS-44 entry (accessed 2017-10-11)
 Mobile Military Radar website, Radar descriptions page, AN/TPS-44 details (accessed 2015-01-02)

Further reading

External links 
 Cardion Electronics legacy support website (accessed 2015-01-01)

Military radars of the United States
Ground radars
Radars of the United States Air Force
Argentine Army